Roy Riddell Coffin (May 10, 1898 – November 10, 1982) was an American field hockey player who competed in the 1932 Summer Olympics.

In 1932 he was a member of the American field hockey team, which won the bronze medal. He played one match as back.

He was born in Philadelphia, Pennsylvania and died in Wallingford, Pennsylvania.

External links
 
Roy Coffin's profile at databaseOlympics
Roy Coffin's profile at Sports Reference.com

1898 births
1982 deaths
American male field hockey players
Field hockey players at the 1932 Summer Olympics
Olympic bronze medalists for the United States in field hockey
Field hockey players from Philadelphia
Medalists at the 1932 Summer Olympics